Liptena albicans, the Cator's liptena, is a butterfly in the family Lycaenidae. It is found in Guinea, Sierra Leone, Liberia, Ivory Coast, Ghana and possibly Nigeria. The habitat consists of forests.

References

Butterflies described in 1904
albicans